Backhouse may refer to:

Outhouse, frequently called "backhouse" in Canada 
Backhouse (surname), people with the surname Backhouse

See also
Backhouse's Bank, Darlington, England